The Columbus Magic was an American soccer club based in Columbus, Ohio that was a member of the American Soccer League. They played their home games in Franklin County Stadium that they shared with Minor League Baseball's Columbus Clippers. The Magic held soccer camps located at Fancyburg Park in Upper Arlington, Ohio.

Year-by-year

Defunct soccer clubs in Ohio
M
American Soccer League (1933–1983) teams
1979 establishments in Ohio
Soccer clubs in Ohio
Sports teams in Columbus, Ohio
1980 disestablishments in Ohio
Association football clubs established in 1979
Association football clubs disestablished in 1980